The table below details World Championship Grand Prix results for the Penske Formula One team. The second table includes results from privately owned Penske cars in World Championship Grands Prix.

Formula One World Championship results

Works entries
(key) (results in bold indicate pole position; results in italics indicate fastest lap)

Notes
 – Not entered as a Constructor.

Results of other Penske cars
(key) (results in bold indicate pole position; results in italics indicate fastest lap)

Non-Championship results
(key) (results in bold indicate pole position; results in italics indicate fastest lap)

References

Formula One constructor results